The Stonemason Ostracon is a figured-limestone ostracon from the Ramesside period of Ancient Egypt, 19–20th Dynasties.

The figured-ostracon is made in outline form with black and (faint)-red paint-(ink). It is a sketchpad ostracon, as sections of red lines remain unfilled, as well as finalized black lines show adjacent to the faint reds. Minor sections of a red frame line remain.

The unflattering figured-character of the stonemason is bald, paunched, with facial stubble, in a leaning-over, and awkward pose. It is a caricature scene, as in a cartoon. The Stonemason is holding his chisel in his left hand and his wooden Egyptian mallet in his right hand.

Ostracon reverse
While the obverse has the Stonemason, the reverse tells an entirely different story. A register (sculpture) of hieroglyphs is across the bottom of the ostracon, below a drawing of the snake, Apep; apparently, the ostracon was once larger, because a seated person (only the knees visible), but outstretched arms (hands) in adoration, are before the snake-God Apep. (See hieroglyph: man-seated: arms in adoration (hieroglyph)) More hieroglyphs are at the upper region of the picture, but the ostracon has discoloration that obscures it.

External links

 Photo, Fitzwilliam Museum write-up, Stonemason Ostracon

References
Hagen, R. Hagen, R.  Egypt: People, Gods, Pharaohs, Rose-Marie & Rainer Hagen, Barnes and Noble Books, 2003, (originally: Taschen, GmbH, Koln, c 2003, 1999); pg. 86. (14 x 13 cm, Photo: 1.2X, slightly larger than natural size.) (hardcover)

Ostracon